Shahin Charmi (born September 17, 1953) is an Iranian-born German multimedia artist, muralist, and painter.

Biography 
Shahin Charmi was born on September 17, 1953, in Iran. He studied at the Muthesius Academy of Art in Kiel, Germany (from 1980 until 1985), under Harald Duwe and Peter Nagel. Charmi is married to Austrian artist Patricia Bolf-Charmi. 

In November 1989, Charmi painted the mural titled,  (English: Revolution and War), located at the Polecat Bunker (German: Iltisbunker Zeichnet) in the Gaardner district of Kiel. The mural is a narrative of the historical events from November 1918 and the Kiel sailor uprising, to World War II, and the murder of Rosa Luxemburg.

In 1990, Charmi was awarded the Golden Plotter Award, for computer art by the city of Gladbeck in Germany.

In 2011, Charmi worked on stage design for Rustam and Esfadyar, for the Fajr Theater Festival at the City Theater of Tehran and Vahdat Hall.

Bibliography

References 

1953 births
Artists from Kiel
Iranian artists
Iranian emigrants to Germany
German multimedia artists
German muralists
Living people